Dámaso Alfonso (born 11 December 1951) is a Cuban sprinter. He competed in the men's 4 × 400 metres relay at the 1976 Summer Olympics. He won a silver medal in the 4 x 400 metres relay at the 1975 Pan American Games.

References

External links

1951 births
Living people
Athletes (track and field) at the 1976 Summer Olympics
Cuban male sprinters
Cuban male hurdlers
Olympic athletes of Cuba
Pan American Games silver medalists for Cuba
Pan American Games medalists in athletics (track and field)
Athletes (track and field) at the 1975 Pan American Games
Medalists at the 1975 Pan American Games
20th-century Cuban people